Richard Savignac (born 11 January 1905) was a French boxer who competed in the 1924 Summer Olympics. In 1924, he was eliminated in the second round of the lightweight class after losing his fight to the upcoming gold medalist, Hans Jacob Nielsen.

References

External links
Part 5 the boxing tournament

1905 births
Year of death missing
Lightweight boxers
Olympic boxers of France
Boxers at the 1924 Summer Olympics
French male boxers